The 1929 World Series featured the American League (AL) champion Philadelphia Athletics playing against the National League (NL) champion Chicago Cubs. The Athletics defeated the Cubs in five games to win the Series.

This Series featured the Athletics' "Mack Attack" (so called in honor of longtime A's owner-manager Connie Mack), in which they overcame an eight-run deficit by scoring 10 runs in the home half of the seventh inning in Game 4 (before two strikeouts by Pat Malone ended it) to gain a 10–8 victory, which ensured the Series did not even out at two games won apiece.  The Athletics were further exalted in the middle of the "Mack Attack" when Cubs center fielder Hack Wilson lost Mule Haas's fly ball in the sun for a fluke three-run inside-the-park home run, bringing the A's to within a run at 8–7.  It was the last occurrence of an inside-the-park home run in a World Series game until Game 1 of the 2015 World Series.

Background 
Because seven of the eight regulars in the Cubs' lineup hit right-handed (except for first baseman Charlie Grimm), Mack started only right-handed pitchers and kept all his left-handed pitchers in the bullpen even though two of his best starters, 300-game-winner-to-be Lefty Grove and Rube Walberg, were left-handed.

Ehmke went on to start Game 5 but failed to get out of the fourth inning, the bullpen and a ninth-inning A's come-from-behind walk-off rally bailing him out.

Summary

Matchups

Game 1

This was the first World Series game ever played at Wrigley Field.

The 35-year-old Ehmke's first-game appearance was no sentimental move by Mack even though he was considered "over the hill", having won only seven games for the slugging A's, pitched only two complete games and worked a scant 55 innings in the regular season. Mack chose Ehmke over Grove or George Earnshaw because he thought Ehmke's pitching technique would surprise the hard-hitting Cubs, and that his sidearm delivery would make it hard for them to pick up the ball against the white-shirted "bleacher bums" of Wrigley Field. Mack had rested Howard's arm by sending him to scout the Cubs for the last few weeks of the season, with both the A's and Cubs far ahead in their respective standings. 

Attending the game was nine-year-old John Paul Stevens, who would grow up to become a Supreme Court Justice. A lifelong Cub fan, Stevens later said, "And that was my first game, a tragic game for a young boy to go and see in person!"

Game 2

Jimmie Foxx became the first player to homer in his first two World Series games. Simmons also homered and had four RBI's. The A's now had a 2-0 lead in the series.

Game 3

Game 3 was a pitcher's duel.  It also featured many tense moments.  Guy Bush won this game for the Cubs only victory, holding the A's to one run despite allowing nine hits and two walks.

Game 4

Sticking to his right-handed-pitchers-only policy, Mack again made a risky move in Game 4 by starting 46-year-old Jack Quinn. Unlike Ehmke, however, Quinn was no challenge to the Cubs hitters, who scored 7 runs off him before Mack pulled him in the sixth inning, setting the stage for the "Mack Attack" in the bottom of the seventh.

After Wilson's miscue on Haas's hit, an unknown fan wrote new lyrics to "My Old Kentucky Home", beginning with "The sun shone bright into poor Hack Wilson's eyes..." and ending "For we'll sing one song for the game and fighting Cubs, for the record whiffing Cubs far away." After seeing his seemingly safe 8–0 lead disintegrate to a 10–8 loss after the A's record seventh and a scoreless last two innings, Cub manager Joe McCarthy was anything but jovial. When a boy came by after the game asking for a baseball, "Marse Joe" muttered, "Come back tomorrow and stand behind Wilson, and you'll be able to pick up all the balls you want!"  That eight-run deficit overcome by the A's on that Columbus Day in Philadelphia is still the largest in postseason history, and Mule Haas's 7th inning inside-the-park home run was the last in a World Series game for 86 years.

Art Nehf's relief pitching appearance in this game was his last in the Major Leagues.

Game 5

Mack gave Ehmke his second start of the Series, but without the advantage of surprise and without the white shirts in Wrigley's bleachers he was ineffective, touched for two runs and taken out in the fourth inning. The A's rallied for their only three runs in the bottom of the ninth to come from behind for the second time in the series and win it at home, 3–2. Haas suddenly tied the game up with a two-run homer; and after a double by Al Simmons and an intentional walk to Jimmie Foxx, Bing Miller's double scored Simmons to give the A's their first World Series Championship in 16 years.

Composite line score
1929 World Series (4–1): Philadelphia Athletics (A.L.) over Chicago Cubs (N.L.)

References

Further reading

External links

 Amateur film footage from the series

World Series
World Series
Philadelphia Athletics postseason
Chicago Cubs postseason
World Series
World Series
1920s in Chicago
1920s in Philadelphia
October 1929 sports events
Baseball competitions in Chicago
Baseball competitions in Philadelphia